The Ropes Mansion (late 1720s), also called Ropes Memorial, is a Georgian Colonial mansion located at 318 Essex Street, located in the McIntire Historic District in Salem, Massachusetts. It is now operated by the Peabody Essex Museum and open to the public.

The house was built for Samuel Barnard, a merchant. In 1768, Judge Nathaniel Ropes, Jr., purchased the house from Barnard's nephew. The Ropes family then inhabited the house until 1907, when the house was given to the Trustees of the Ropes Memorial for public benefit.

Although altered through the years and then restored, the house looks much like its original form, with a symmetrical facade of two stories, three small pedimented gables through the roof, roof balustrade, and modillioned cornice. (Compare it to the Crowninshield-Bentley House and the Peirce-Nichols House, also in Salem.) In 1807, however, its interior was extensively renovated. In the mid-1830s five rooms and the central hall were remodelled, and today's doorway installed (with details inspired by Asher Benjamin's pattern book). In 1894 the house was moved away from the street and further modified internally. A large, fine garden was added behind the house in 1912.

It was featured in the 1993 Disney film "Hocus Pocus" and the 2021 novel "Salem's Ropes."

See also
List of historic houses in Massachusetts

References 
 Bryant F. Tolles, Jr., Architecture in Salem: An Illustrated Guide, University Press of New England, Hanover and London, reissued 2004.

Historic house museums in Massachusetts
Houses in Salem, Massachusetts
Peabody Essex Museum
Houses completed in 1768
18th-century architecture in the United States
1768 establishments in Massachusetts